Hungary competed at the 1972 Winter Olympics in Sapporo, Japan.

Figure skating

Women

External links
Official Olympic Reports
International Olympic Committee results database
 Olympic Winter Games 1972, full results by sports-reference.com

Nations at the 1972 Winter Olympics
1972
1972 in Hungarian sport